Greg Weiner is a professional photographer. He is well known for his erotic images of nude male models.

Biography

Weiner has been one of Playgirl's primary photographers since the early 1990s. Greg also shoots for Paragon Men, a monthly web-zine featuring "artistic male physique imagery and erotica."  Among the male models he has shot nude are actor Joe Zaso, Anthony Catanzaro, Levi Johnston, actor and human rights activist Ben Patrick Johnson, and former Menudo Angelo Garcia.

References

Living people
American erotic photographers
Year of birth missing (living people)